George Merrill Witte is an American poet and book editor from Madison, New Jersey. Witte is the editor-in-chief of St. Martin's Press. He is the author of Does She Have a Name?, Deniability: Poems and The Apparitioners: Poems.

Career
George Witte is the author of three books of poetry: Does She Have a Name, Deniability and The Apparitioners.

His poems have also been published in The Atlantic, The Antioch Review, Boulevard, Gettysburg Review, The Hopkins Review, The Kenyon Review, Ploughshares, Poetry (magazine), Prairie Schooner, New York Quarterly, Southwest Review, Virginia Quarterly Review, and The Yale Review.

Witte has also worked in book publishing at St. Martin's Press for thirty three years, as an editor, the publisher of Picador USA, and now as editor in chief. A graduate of Duke University and the University of North Carolina at Chapel Hill, he lives in Ridgewood, New Jersey.

Awards
Witte received Poetry's Frederick Bock Prize for a group of poems, a poetry fellowship from the New Jersey Council on the Arts/Department of State, and his poem "At Dusk, the Catbird" was selected for The Best American Poetry 2007 anthology.

Collected works

 Does She Have a Name? NYQ Books, 2014

Anthologies
 The Best American Poetry 2007
 Vocabula Bound 2
 Old Flame: From the First 10 Years of 32 Poems
 Rabbit Ears: TV Poems, ed. Joel Allegretti (NYQ Books, 2015)
 The Doll Collection, ed. Diane Lockward (Terrapin Books, 2016)
 Meta-Land: Poets of the Palisades II, ed. Paul Nash and Denise La Neve (The Poet's Press, 2016)
 What Editors Do: The Art, Craft, and Business of Book Editing, ed. Peter Ginna (University of Chicago Press, 2017)

See also

 Deniability: Poems
 New York Sun
 Library Journal
 The Environmentalist
 The Huffington Post
 Chicago Sun-Times
 St. Martin's Press

References

External links
 "Night Swimming" in The Yale Review
 "Process of Elimination" in Hopkins Review
 "Constellations" in Valparaiso Poetry Review
 "Gully," "Thaw," "Narcissus," and "Totenwald" in Poetry
 "As Is" in Nimrod
 "The Hatch" in Poetry Northwest
 "The Way Back" in The Antioch Review
 George Witte Goodreads page
 Does She Have a Name? at NYQ Books
 Does She Have a Name? at Small Press Distribution
 New York Sun
 Academia
 Orchises Press
 The Environmentalist
 The Huffington Post
 Does She Have a Name? on Amazon
  Does She Have a Name? on Barnes & Noble
 The Apparitioners on Amazon
 Deniability on Amazon
 Deniability on Barnes & Noble
 St. Martin's Press

American male poets
People from Madison, New Jersey
People from Ridgewood, New Jersey
Living people
Poets from New Jersey
Formalist poets
20th-century American poets
21st-century American poets
American book editors
Duke University alumni
20th-century American male writers
21st-century American male writers
Year of birth missing (living people)